Tara Jones may refer to:

 Tara Jones, English rugby league player

 Tara Spires-Jones, American neuroscientist
 Tara Jones, a character in the YA graphic novel Heartstopper and its television adaptation